The Suzuki SX4 WRC is a World Rally Car built for the Suzuki World Rally Team by Suzuki in the World Rally Championship. It is based upon the Suzuki SX4 road car, and was debuted at the 2007 Tour de Corse.

Competition history

World Rally Championship

However, due to WRC calendar changes Suzuki officially debuted in 2008, using the season of 2007 as further development time for the SX4.

The SX4 competed on a test basis in two 2007 WRC events: the Rallye de France in October 2007 (finishing 31st overall) and the Rally GB in November 2007 (finishing 27th overall). In the first event of 2008, the Rallye Monte Carlo, Suzuki driver Per-Gunnar Andersson finished eighth.

Hillclimbing
A race car called 'Suzuki SX4 Hill Climb Special' was used at the 2011 Pikes Peak International Hill Climb. Driver Nobuhiro Tajima won the event in Suzukis for six years running, the last three of which were in the SX4 HCS, and set the track record time of 9:51.278.

Rally results

Complete World Rally Championship results

References

External links

  

All-wheel-drive vehicles
SX4 WRC
World Rally Cars